Jo Zebedee (born 1971), is a Northern Irish science fiction and fantasy writer, based in Carrickfergus near Belfast. She attended Victoria Primary School and Carrickfergus Grammar School before completing a degree in English Literature. Zebedee has been chairperson for Women Aloud NI. Zebedee also works for her own management consultancy and for the Crescent Arts Centre where she runs creative writing classes. She is also a mentor with the Irish Writers' Centre. Zebedee was a guest of the Belfast Book festival and the C. S. Lewis festival. She was a guest for Titancon, the main Northern Ireland convention, and chair for the event in 2020. She's also been a guest of Octocon, Ireland's national convention. She is considered one of Ireland's top Science fiction and fantasy writers.

Bibliography

Series 
Inheritance Trilogy
 Abendau's Heir (2015) 
 Sunset Over Abendau (2016) 
 Abendau's Legacy (2016) 
Novels 
Inish Carraig (2015)
Waters and the Wild (2017)
Anthology
Flash! (2018)

References and sources

1971 births
People from Carrickfergus
Women writers from Northern Ireland
Living people